The federal city of Moscow, Russia is divided into administrative districts called administrative okrugs, which are a subdivision of state administration. They are further divided into municipal formations called districts (raions) and settlements (poseleniy), which are local self-government entities.

Overview
Administratively, the city is divided into 12 administrative okrugs, which in turn are subdivided into 146 administrative units, which include 125 administrative districts and 21 administrative settlements. Municipally, each of the 146 administrative units have municipal status as 125 municipal okrugs, 19 municipal settlements, and 2 urban okrugs. The municipalities of Shcherbinka and Troitsk are styled "urban okrugs" due to their former municipal status within the territory in Moscow Oblast which became New Moscow.

The city does not have a downtown area; the urban core is scattered across the city. Prominent business areas include Tverskoy, Arbat, and Presnensky Districts (the latter being home to the Moscow-City complex). Central Administrative Okrug as a whole has a large concentration of businesses. The city hall and major administration buildings are located in Tverskoy District (home to the Moscow Kremlin). Western Administrative Okrug is home to Moscow State University, Sparrow Hills and Mosfilm Studios, while North-Eastern hosts Ostankino Tower and VDNKh Exhibition Park. The total population of the Federal City of Moscow was 11,503,501 inhabitants at the Russian Census (2010).

On July 1, 2012, Moscow's land area grew by 1,490 sq km (580 sq mi), taking in territory from Moscow Oblast and called New Moscow.

Administrative okrugs

Central Administrative Okrug
The territory of Kitay-gorod is not a part of any district and is governed directly by the administrative okrug.

Northern Administrative Okrug

North-Eastern Administrative Okrug

Eastern Administrative Okrug

South-Eastern Administrative Okrug

Southern Administrative Okrug

South-Western Administrative Okrug

Western Administrative Okrug

North-Western Administrative Okrug

Zelenogradsky Administrative Okrug

Novomoskovsky Administrative Okrug

Troitsky Administrative Okrug

Territorial units with special status
Former territorial units with special status which existed in 1995–2002, and were not part of the districts in which they were located:
 Bitsevsky Park
 Izmaylovsky Park
 Losiny Ostrov
 Sokolniki Park
 ZIL
 Zelenogradskaya
 Moscow State University
 Sheremetyevsky
 Southwestern Center of Science and Industry
 Vodny Stadion
 Moscow-City
 Kuzminki–Lyublino
 Kitay-gorod

All territorial units with special status were merged into districts in 2002.

History

Russian Empire

Russian Soviet Federative Socialist Republic
1917–1920
In 1917 Moscow was divided into 8 districts. In October 1917 Moscow was divided into 11 districts.
1920–1936
In 1936 Moscow was divided into 7 districts.
1936–1960
In 1936 Moscow was divided into 23 districts.
1960–1969
In 1960 Moscow was divided into 17 districts.
1969–1991

In 1969 Moscow was divided into 30 districts:
Central part of Moscow
 Sokolnichesky
 Baumansky
 Kalininsky
 Zhdanovsky
 Proletarsky
 Moskvoretsky
 Oktyabrsky
 Leninsky
 Kievsky
 Krasnopresnensky
 Frunzensky
 Sverdlovsky
 Dzerzhinsky
 Other districts within the Moscow Ring Road
 Kuybyshevsky
 Pervomaysky
 Perovsky
 Volgogradsky
 Lyublinsky
 Krasnogvardeysky
 Sovetsky
 Cheryomushkinsky
 Gagarinsky
 Kuntsevsky
 Khoroshyovsky (later renamed Voroshilovsky, and then back to Khoroshyovsky)
 Tushinsky
 Leningradsky
 Timiryazevsky
 Kirovsky
 Babushkinsky
 outside the Moscow Ring Road:
 Zelenogradsky

In 1977, Zheleznodorozhny and Sevastopolsky Districts were established. Sevastopolsky District was split off Sovetsky and Cheryomushkinsky Districts, whereas Zheleznodorozhny District was split off Kirovsky and Timiryazevsky Districts.

In 1984, a number of localities which previously belonged to Moscow Oblast were appended to Moscow. In particular, the town of Solntsevo was transferred to Moscow, and Solntsevsky District was established.

Russian Federation

Parts of Moscow Oblast's territory, including the towns of Troitsk, Moskovsky, and Shcherbinka, as well as parts of the territories of Leninsky, Naro-Fominsky, and Podolsky Districts, were transferred to Moscow on July 1, 2012. The new territories have been organized into two new administrative okrugs—Novomoskovsky and Troitsky.

References

External links
 Administrative-territorial structure of Moscow – The official website of the Mayor and the Government of Moscow
 Map of Moscow boundary expansion – The official website of the Mayor and the Government of Moscow

 

Government of Moscow
Moscow